Éric Bruneau (born April 21, 1983) is a Canadian actor. He is most noted for his regular supporting role as Liam Bouchard in the television series Coroner, and his starring role as Charles Rivard in the television series Virage: Double faute.

He is married to Kim Lévesque-Lizotte, a writer for Virage.

Filmography

Film

Television

References

External links

1983 births
Living people
21st-century Canadian male actors
Canadian male film actors
Canadian male television actors
French Quebecers
Male actors from Quebec
People from Saint-Jean-sur-Richelieu